Chang "FreedoM" Youngsuk (born April 26, 1988) is a South Korean professional esports player of the real-time strategy games StarCraft and WarCraft III.  He is known by his pseudonym FreedoM or FreeDoM. Chang entered the E-sports world in 2004 where he started his career playing as the Night Elf race in the game WarCraft III.

Chang represented South Korea in WarCraft III at the World Cyber Games 2004, winning the 2004 national Korean qualifier.  In 2005, he once again placed first on the World E-sports Festival. After the "MBC Map Scandal" where maps were rigged in order to make the Orc race more powerful, Freedom decided to quit playing WarCraft III and move onto playing StarCraft in 2006.  Since then, his team Samsung Khan, won the championship for the StarCraft Pro-League 2006–2007 season.

Currently he is one of the most successful Korean poker players.  He has won 4th place at the 2008 Asian Poker Tour (APT) Manila where he took over $38,000 in prize money.

Tournament placings
2003 MBC Sonokong Prime League III - 3rd place
2004 World Cyber Games Korea national qualifier - 1st Place
2005 MBC Land Cinema Prime League V - 3rd place
2005 World E-Sports Festival - 1st Place
2005 Ongamenet Invitational - 1st place
2007 Shinhan ProLeague - 1st place

Poker
2008 APPT Manila 2008 4th Place ($38,000)

References

External links
Freedom's fan cafe (Korean)

1988 births
StarCraft players
South Korean esports players
South Korean poker players
Living people
Warcraft III players